Nadine Secunde (born 21 December 1953) is an American operatic soprano. She studied and performed in Germany, singing at the Bayreuth Festival the leading parts of Elsa in Lohengrin and Sieglinde in Die Walküre, and made an international career. A specialist for the works of Wagner and Richard Strauss, she has also performed contemporary operas.

Career 

Secunde was born in Independence near Cleveland, Ohio. She studied piano and voice at the Oberlin Conservatory and Indiana University with Margarete Harshaw. She studied from 1979 on a Fulbright scholarship at the Musikhochschule Stuttgart. In 1980, she was engaged at the Hessisches Staatstheater Wiesbaden. She performed in 1982 the part of Elvira in Auber's Die Stumme von Portici, conducted by Siegfried Köhler, Sinaide, the pharao's wife, in Rossini's Mosè, alongside Eike Wilm Schulte as the pharao, and Micaela in Bizet's Carmen, Later she performed also major roles in Wagner operas.

She became a member of the Cologne Opera in 1985 and received attention in her début in the title part of Janáceks Káťa Kabanová, staged by Harry Kupfer and conducted by Gerd Albrecht. She performed the title role of Arabella by Richard Strauss at the Bavarian State Opera.

Secunde appeared at the Bayreuth Festival first in 1987, as Elsa in the Lohengrin production conducted by Daniel Barenboim. She sang the part also at Covent Garden in London in 1988, and at the Teatro La Fenice in Venice in 1990. From 1988 to 1992, she was in Bayreuth Sieglinde in Die Walküre, a part which she also performed in Cologne and in 1991 at the Teatro Liceo in Barcelona. She sang at Covent Garden Chrysothemis in Elektra by Strauss in 1990. The same year, she performed the title role of Judith by Siegfried Matthus at the Seattle Opera in the work's U.S. premiere. In 1991, she performed Cassandre in Les Troyens by Hector Berlioz in Los Angeles. In 1996, Secunde sang the three Brünnhilde roles in Wagner's Ring Cycle at Teatro Colon in Buenos Aires.

Secunde performed the part of the primadonna in the premiere of Hans Werner Henze's one-act opera Venus und Adonis at the Bavarian State Opera on 11 January 1997, conducted by Markus Stenz. She performed Brünnhilde in Wagner's Ring Cycle at the Wrocław Opera, completed in 2006. In 2018, she returned to Wiesbaden as the Kabanicha in Janáček's Katja Kabanowa.

Recordings and honours 

Secunde recorded the part of Miss Jessel in Benjamin Britten's The Turn of the Screw in 1993, a production of the Aldeburgh Festival conducted by Steuart Bedford, and alongside Philip Langridge as Quint. A review noted her "powerful voice", continuing: She "is quite superb in 'her' scene (Act 2 Scene 3/Variation X, 'Miss Jessel'), her voice wonderfully rich." In 2002, she recorded the title role of Dmitri Shostakovich's Lady Macbeth of Mtsensk on DVD, in a production of the Teatro Liceo conducted by Alexander Anisimov. She received praise not only for her singing but also her "formidable acting skills".

Secunde is an honorary member of the Hessisches Staatstheater.

References

External links 
 Nadine Secunde official website
 
 
 Nadine Secunde Semperoper 
 Nadine Secunde wagneropera.net
 Nadine Secunde opera-concert.com
 Interview with Nadine Secunde, October 15, 1988

Living people
Musicians from Cleveland
Oberlin College alumni
American operatic sopranos
1953 births
State University of Music and Performing Arts Stuttgart alumni
American expatriates in Germany
People from Independence, Ohio
Classical musicians from Ohio
Singers from Ohio
21st-century American women